Charles Alcock may refer to:
Charles Alcock (priest) (1754–1803), English priest
Charles R. Alcock (born 1951), New Zealand astronomer
Charles W. Alcock (1842–1907), sports administrator, creator of the FA Cup and organiser of the first cricket Test in England